Joseph Knowles (born 10 July 1996) is an Australian professional footballer who plays as a striker for A-League Men club Brisbane Roar.

In January 2017, he was offered a senior contract for the 2017–18 season, while in May the club confirmed he signed it.

In 2018/19, Knowles played for 4 months with Scottish outfit Largs Thistle.

Before the 2022–23 A-League Men season, Knowles trialed for A-League Men club Brisbane Roar, scoring against Leeds United in a pre-season friendly.

References

External links
 

Living people
1996 births
Association football forwards
Australian soccer players
Perth Glory FC players
Largs Thistle F.C. players
Perth RedStar FC players
Oakleigh Cannons FC players
Brisbane Roar FC players
A-League Men players
National Premier Leagues players